O'Sullivan College is a small bilingual private college that was founded in 1916.  It is located at 1191, Mountain Street in downtown Montreal. The college is near Peel and Lucien L'Allier metro stations.

The college offers ten programs granting both Attestation of Collegial Studies (AEC) and Diploma of Collegial Studies (DEC).

Programs

DEC
Paralegal Technology - 3 years
Accelerated Paralegal Technology - 2 ½ years
Medical Records - 3 years
General Administration (offered in French only) - 2 ½ years

AEC
Computerized Financial Accounting (offered in French only) - 1 year
International Trade (offered in French only) - 8 intensive months
Office Systems Technology Legal Specialization (offered in French only) - 8 intensive months
Medical Transcription and Secretary (offered in French only) - 1 intensive year
Damage Insurance and English Communication (offered in French only) - 1 intensive year
Media Technology and Film Sets (offered in French only) - 1 year

External links
O'Sullivan College

Colleges in Quebec
Universities and colleges in Montreal
Educational institutions established in 1916
Private universities and colleges in Canada
1916 establishments in Quebec